Lanzhou Zhongchuan International Airport  is an airport serving Lanzhou, the capital of Gansu Province, China. It was opened in 1970 and serves as a major air hub for the province of Gansu and western China. There are eight gates served by aerobridges in the terminal. A new larger (61,000 m2) Terminal 2 is located to the South, adjacent to the existing terminal. The new terminal adds nine aerobridges.

Lanzhou Airport is a focus city for Hainan Airlines. Passenger traffic at Lanzhou Airport in 2014 was 6.58 million, with 10 million passengers per year projected for 2020.

History
Lanzhou's first airport, Gongxingdun Airport, was located just  from the city centre. By 1957, the Civil Aviation Administration of China decided that Gongxingun Airport's location was too restrictive for the aviation needs of Lanzhou and designated a new site near Zhongchuan town.

In 1968 construction was started on Lanzhou airport and on July 26, 1970, the maiden flight took place with the first aircraft landing of an Ilyushin Il-14. On June 15, 1997, an expansion project was officially started.

In 2010, Lanzhou airport's passenger throughput exceeded 3 million people a year. and the second expansion project started. Lanzhou Airport Terminal 2 officially started construction in 2010, after preliminary design approval and with an investment budget of 1.488 billion yuan.
In 2013, Lanzhou airport's passenger throughput exceeded 5 million passengers per annum, increasing the official Lanzhou airport ranking among the major airports within China. Terminal 2 opened in 2015 and later that year the Lanzhou–Zhongchuan Airport intercity railway between the airport and Lanzhou's urban area opened.

The third expansion phase started in 2019. At a cost of 31.69 billion Yuan, a new Terminal 3 will be built, two new 4000 meter long runways and facilities will be expanded. Terminal 3 will be four times larger than the current combined terminal floor area. The entirety of adjacent namesake Zhongchuan town and several villages, totaling , were demolished to make way for the expansion, and residents were relocated to Lanzhou and Lanzhou New Area.

Terminal complex
While nominally two terminals, they are connected airside by a lengthy walkway and operate as a single building. Airlines operating from one terminal may use gates at the other.

Terminal 1
Shaped like the letter T, this terminal consisted of eight airbridges. The original terminal had a single airside level for arrivals and departures. Arrivals were segregated by a glass screen from departing passengers. Check-in was handled on the upper level, while the lower level housed the baggage hall.

With the opening of Terminal 2, this terminal's landside facilities have been shut down for refurbishment and parts of the terminal will be mothballed until future growth warrants the reopening of these facilities. Airside lounges, gates and shops remain in use.

Terminal 2
Designed and shaped to resemble the wing of flying geese, at 61,000m2, this terminal greatly increased the operational space at Lanzhou Airport. It added an extra two piers to the existing terminal. It houses 30 extra check-in desks, 12 passenger gates, 9 airbridges and separate levels for arriving and departing passengers. The new terminal was opened for travellers in February 2015.

Terminal 3
Terminal 3 construction preparations started in 2019. The terminal will have 87 gates.

Airlines and destinations

Passenger

Cargo

Ground transportation connections

Rail

The Lanzhou–Zhongchuan Airport intercity railway between the airport and the city started operation on 2015-09-30. It provides fast train services between the Zhongchuan Airport railway station and the new major transportation hub at Lanzhou West railway station then terminates at the older Lanzhou railway station.

Road

Shuttle bus
There are three Airport Express Shuttle Bus services available from the airport. All routes cost 30RMB.
 Line 1 runs to the Lanzhou Eastern Hotel, Tianshui Middle Road, opposite Lanzhou University western gate. The return service leaves from opposite the JJ Sun Hotel (next to CAAC Ticket Office), Donggang West Road. Travel time is about one hour, due to the distant nature of airport from the city centre. This is the closest service to Lanzhou Railway Station.
 Line 2 runs to Golden Lily Hotel, Xijin East Road, via Taohai Market, Anning West Road. This is the closest service to Lanzhou West Railway Station.
 Line 3 runs to Qingshuiqiao in western Lanzhou.
Taxi
Taxi service is relatively expensive due to the long distance to the airport, about 150RMB. Many taxis will be reluctant to use their meter and demand a flat 200RMB fare to downtown Lanzhou despite being illegal to do so. Overall there is little time travel advantage over using the Airport Express bus.

See also
List of airports in China

References

External links

Airports in Gansu
Buildings and structures in Lanzhou
Transport in Lanzhou
Airports established in 1970
1970 establishments in China